Lacey Eden (born May 2, 2002) is an American women's ice hockey player for Wisconsin. She represented the United States women's national ice hockey team at the 2021 and 2022 IIHF Women's World Championship.

Playing career
Eden began her collegiate career for the Wisconsin Badgers during the 2020–21 season. During her first month with the team, she tied for the league lead among rookies in goals (three), assists (four) and points (seven), shots on goal (23), and plus/minus (+6). She was subsequently named the WCHA Rookie of the Month for the month of February 2021. She finished the season with eight goals and seven assists in 15 games and helped the Badgers win the National Collegiate Women's Ice Hockey Championship. Following an outstanding season she was named to the USCHO All-Rookie Team.

International play
Eden represented the United States at the 2019 IIHF World Women's U18 Championship where she won a silver medal. She again represented the United States at the 2020 IIHF World Women's U18 Championship, where she led the team in scoring with five points and won a gold medal.

She was named to the roster for the United States at the 2021 IIHF Women's World Championship.

Personal life
Eden was born to Bill and Karen Eden. She has one brother, Liam.

Career statistics

Regular season and playoffs

International

References

External links

2002 births
Living people
American women's ice hockey forwards
Wisconsin Badgers women's ice hockey players
Ice hockey people from Maryland
Sportspeople from Annapolis, Maryland